Eternamente Pagú is a 1988 biopic about Patrícia Galvão, directed by Norma Bengell and starring Carla Camurati.

Plot
Eternamente Pagú is a biographical film about Patrícia Galvão, best known as Pagu, a Brazilian political, literary and artistic activist. An important figure of the Brazilian Modernism, Pagu was also a militant for the Brazilian Communist Party after she married writer Oswald de Andrade. She broke up with Andrade and, as a journalist was arrested by the Dictatorship of Getúlio Vargas. After she left prison, she abandoned Communism in favor of Trotskyist Socialism, married Geraldo Ferraz, and started a career as theatre director.

Cast
Carla Camurati as Patrícia "Pagu" Galvão
Antônio Fagundes as Oswald de Andrade
Esther Góes as Tarsila do Amaral
Nina de Pádua as Sideria
Otávio Augusto as Geraldo Ferraz
Paulo Villaça as Pagu's father
Norma Bengell as Elsie Houston
Antonio Pitanga
Breno Moroni
Kito Junqueira
Maria Sílvia
Suzana Faini
Beth Goulart
Marcelo Picchi
Carlos Gregório
Eduardo Lago
Ariel Coelho

Reception
At the 16th Festival de Gramado, it received the Best Actress Award (Camurati) and the Best Adapted Score Award.

References

External links

1988 films
Brazilian biographical drama films
1980s feminist films
1980s Portuguese-language films
1980s biographical drama films
1988 directorial debut films
1988 drama films